Automola is a genus of flies in the family Richardiidae. There are at least three described species in Automola.

Species
These three species belong to the genus Automola:
A. atomaria (Wiedemann, 1830) c g
A. caloptera (Bigot, 1886) c g
A. rufa Cresson, 1906 i c g b
Data sources: i = ITIS, c = Catalogue of Life, g = GBIF, b = Bugguide.net

References

Further reading

 

Articles created by Qbugbot
Tephritoidea genera